Chippenham is a constituency represented in the House of Commons of the Parliament of the United Kingdom since 2015 by Michelle Donelan, a Conservative, who also currently serves as Secretary of State for Digital, Culture, Media and Sport. The 2010 constituency includes the Wiltshire towns of Bradford on Avon, Chippenham, Corsham and Melksham.

A parliamentary borough of Chippenham was enfranchised in 1295. It sent two burgesses to Parliament until 1868 and one thereafter until the borough constituency was abolished in 1885. There was a county division constituency named after the town of Chippenham from 1885 to 1983, when the name of that constituency was changed to North Wiltshire.

Following the 2003–2005 review into parliamentary representation in Wiltshire, the Boundary Commission created a new county constituency, reviving the name of Chippenham as a seat. It is formed from parts of the previously existing Devizes, North Wiltshire and Westbury constituencies.

Boundaries

Historical boundaries

1295–1832: The parliamentary borough of Chippenham in the unreformed Parliament consisted of only part of the parish of Chippenham in Wiltshire. However, as Chippenham was a burgage borough, in which the right to vote was confined to the resident occupiers of specific properties, the boundary had no practical function. The borough had a population of 1,620 in 1831, for 283 houses.

1832–1885: The Boundary Act which accompanied the Great Reform Act extended the boundaries of the parliamentary borough, to include the whole of Chippenham parish, the adjoining parishes of Hardenhuish and Langley Burrell, as well as the extra-parochial district of Pewsham. This more than trebled the borough's population, to 5,270 by the 1831 figures, for 883 houses.

1885–1918: During this period, Wiltshire was split into five county divisions and one borough, of which The North-Western (or Chippenham) Division of Wiltshire was one; it was often colloquially referred to simply as either Chippenham or as North-West Wiltshire. It was bordered by the Cricklade division to the east, Westbury to the south and Devizes to the southeast. Over the county boundary were the Thornbury division of Gloucestershire to the west, the Cirencester division of Gloucestershire to the north and the Frome division of Somerset to the southwest.

The Chippenham division included the towns of Calne and Malmesbury as well as Chippenham, both of which had also been parliamentary boroughs in their own right before 1885. By the outbreak of World War I, the population of the constituency was about 45,000.

1918–1950: In 1918 Wiltshire was split into five divisions, but there was no borough constituency in the county. The Wiltshire, Chippenham division was expanded, taking in the towns of Cricklade and Wootton Bassett, also former parliamentary boroughs, as well as the surrounding rural areas: in full, it was composed of the then Municipal Boroughs of Calne, Chippenham, Malmesbury and the Rural Districts of Calne, Chippenham, Malmesbury, part of Cricklade and Wootton Bassett, Tetbury Rural District (excluding the part in the administrative county of Gloucestershire).

1950–1983: In the redistribution, which took effect at the 1950 general election, Wiltshire was divided into one borough and four county constituencies. Chippenham County Constituency consisted of the same Municipal Boroughs as in 1918 and the Rural Districts of Calne and Chippenham, Cricklade and Wootton Bassett and Malmesbury.

2010 constituency

The electoral wards which form the new Chippenham seat are taken from the former districts of North Wiltshire and West Wiltshire.

From North Wiltshire: Cepen Park, Chippenham Allington, Chippenham Audley, Chippenham Avon, Chippenham Hill Rise, Chippenham London Road, Chippenham Monkton Park, Chippenham Park, Chippenham Pewsham, Chippenham Redland, Chippenham Westcroft/Queens, Corsham, Lacock with Neston and Gastard, Pickwick
From West Wiltshire: the wards of Atworth and Whitley, Bradford-on-Avon North, Bradford-on-Avon South, Holt, Manor Vale, Melksham North, Melksham Spa, Melksham Without, Melksham Woodrow, Paxcroft

Members of Parliament

MPs 1295–1640

MPs 1640–1868

MPs 1868–1983

MPs since 2010
The Chippenham name was revived in 2010 for the new constituency that includes Bradford on Avon, Chippenham, Corsham and Melksham.

Elections

Elections in the 2010s

Elections in the 1970s

Elections in the 1960s

Elections in the 1950s

Elections in the 1940s

Elections in the 1930s

Elections in the 1920s

Elections in the 1910s

A general election was expected to take place in 1914/15. The following were to be candidates; 
George Terrell (Unionist) 
Harold Gorst (Liberal) 

A petition was lodged in relation to the December 1910 election, but this was later withdrawn after a recount, resulting in the above numbers. The original count had placed the Conservatives with 4,139 votes and the Liberals with 4,113 votes.

Elections in the 1900s

Elections in the 1890s

Elections in the 1880s

Elections in the 1870s

Elections in the 1860s

 Seat reduced to one member

Elections in the 1850s

 

 Caused by Neeld's death.

Elections in the 1840s

 Caused by Boldero's appointment as Clerk of the Ordnance

Elections in the 1830s

See also
 List of parliamentary constituencies in Wiltshire

Notes

References

Sources

 Boundaries of Parliamentary Constituencies 1885–1972, compiled and edited by F.W.S. Craig (Parliamentary Reference Publications 1972)
 British Parliamentary Election Results 1832–1885, compiled and edited by F.W.S. Craig (Macmillan Press 1977)
 British Parliamentary Election Results 1885–1918, compiled and edited by F.W.S. Craig (Macmillan Press 1974)
 British Parliamentary Election Results 1918–1949, compiled and edited by F.W.S. Craig (Macmillan Press, revised edition 1977)
 British Parliamentary Election Results 1950–1973, compiled and edited by F.W.S. Craig (Parliamentary Research Services 1983)
 Who's Who of British Members of Parliament: Volume I 1832–1885, edited by M. Stenton (The Harvester Press 1976)
 Who's Who of British Members of Parliament, Volume II 1886–1918, edited by M. Stenton and S. Lees (Harvester Press 1978)
 Who's Who of British Members of Parliament, Volume III 1919–1945, edited by M. Stenton and S. Lees (Harvester Press 1979)
 Who's Who of British Members of Parliament, Volume IV 1945–1979, edited by M. Stenton and S. Lees (Harvester Press 1981)
Robert Beatson, A Chronological Register of Both Houses of Parliament (London: Longman, Hurst, Res & Orme, 1807)  
D Brunton & D H Pennington, Members of the Long Parliament (London: George Allen & Unwin, 1954)
Cobbett's Parliamentary history of England, from the Norman Conquest in 1066 to the year 1803 (London: Thomas Hansard, 1808) 
 J Holladay Philbin, Parliamentary Representation 1832 – England and Wales (New Haven: Yale University Press, 1965)
 Frederic A Youngs Jr, Guide to the Local Administrative Units of England, Vol I (London: Royal Historical Society, 1979)

External links
nomis Constituency Profile for Chippenham — presenting data from the ONS annual population survey and other official statistics.
 Wilfred Emmanuel-Jones, Conservative PPC pre-campaign website
 Duncan Hames, Liberal Democrat PPC pre-campaign website
 Greg Lovell, Labour PPC pre-campaign website

Chippenham
Parliamentary constituencies in Wiltshire
Constituencies of the Parliament of the United Kingdom established in 1295
Constituencies of the Parliament of the United Kingdom disestablished in 1983
Constituencies of the Parliament of the United Kingdom established in 2010
Members of Parliament for Chippenham